Plaridel, officially the Municipality of Plaridel, is a 5th class municipality in the province of Quezon, Philippines. According to the 2020 census, it has a population of 10,129 people.

The municipality was created in 1962 by virtue of Republic Act No. 3493 where its territories carved out from Atimonan.

Geography
The smallest municipality in the province of Quezon, Plaridel has an area of 33 square kilometers comprising nine barangays - four of which are poblaciones - and its population is around 11,000. It lies between the towns of Atimonan and Gumaca, hugging the coastline of the Province alongside Maharlika Highway. Its inhabitants are occupied primarily with fishing. Those engaged in Agriculture plant mostly coconut and rice. A visitor this town must taste and savor its local version of Suman.

Barangays
Plaridel is politically subdivided into 9 barangays.

 Concepcion
 Duhat
 Ilaya
 Ilosong
 Tanauan
 Central (Poblacion)
 Paang Bundok (Poblacion)
 Paaralan or Pampaaralan (Poblacion)
 M. L. Tumagay (Poblacion)

Barangays Duhat, Ilaya, and Ilosong are south of the Poblacion, and are accessed by a paved road which connects with the National Maharlika Highway at Barangay Pampaaralan (also called Paaralan).  This road is also the main access to Barangay Kulawit, part of the Municipality of Atimonan to the west.

Climate

Demographics

Religion
Roman Catholic
Iglesia Ni Cristo
Seventh Day Adventist
Bible Baptist

Economy

Government

Elected officials
Municipal council (2022-2025):
Mayor: Jose D. Saavedra
Vice Mayor: Bernardo V. Tumagay
Councilors:
 Sixto Alva
 Rommel Caparros 
 Victor Tumagay
 Atorni Dee Magbuhos
 Don-Don Anda
 Omack Camba
 Estelita Javier
 Darwin Alvarez

References

External links
Plaridel Profile at PhilAtlas.com
An Act Creating the Municipality of Plaridel in the Province of Quezon
[ Philippine Standard Geographic Code]
Philippine Census Information
Local Governance Performance Management System

Municipalities of Quezon